Hong Kong under-20 football team is a regional association football youth team of Hong Kong and is controlled by the Hong Kong Football Association.

Results

AFC U-20 Championship

Coaching Staff

Current squad
The following 23 players were named for the upcoming 2023 AFC U-20 Asian Cup qualification held in Indonesia.
 Head coach:  Cheung Kin Fung

|-----
! colspan="9" bgcolor="#B0D3FB" align="left" |

|-----
! colspan="9" bgcolor="#B0D3FB" align="left" |

|-----
! colspan="9" bgcolor="#B0D3FB" align="left" |

Recent call-ups 
The following players have been called up for the team within the previous 12 months.

INJ Player withdrew from the squad due to an injury
PRE Preliminary squad
WD  Player withdrawn from the squad.
RET Player retired from international football

Recent results and fixtures

2022

See also
Hong Kong national football team
Hong Kong national under-23 football team
Hong Kong national under-17 football team
Hong Kong Football Association
Football in Hong Kong
Sport in Hong Kong
Hong Kong

References

External links
 The Hong Kong Football Association

Under-20
Asian national under-20 association football teams